Min Htihlaing was governor of Prome (Pyay) from 1388/89 to  1390, according to the Maha Yazawin and Hmannan Yazawin chronicles. However, the two chronicles are internally inconsistent; they say in their Summary of Rulers of Prome section that Htihlaing ruled until 1393/94. The other main chronicle  Yazawin Thit does not list him as governor of Prome at all.

References

Bibliography
 
 
 

Ava dynasty